Gideon Oluwaseun Olanrewaju (born 10 July 1993) is a Nigerian social entrepreneur and educational development practitioner who created Aid for Rural Education Access Initiative (AREAi), non-profit organisation that creates multiple quality informal and alternative learning systems in rural communities and has facilitated access to education for over 6,000 disadvantaged children in Nigeria.

Education
Olanrewaju obtained a Bachelor's Degree in Biochemistry from Ladoke Akintola University of Nigeria in Ogbomoso in 2015. He also holds a Masters of Arts (MA) degree in International Education and Development from the Center of International Education (CIE), University of Sussex, United Kingdom and Certificate in Entrepreneurial Leadership and Non-profit Management from African Leadership Academy, South Africa and Lagos Business School respectively.

Career and activism
Olanrewaju's mission is to see a world where every child, regardless of socio-economic status or geographical location have access to quality educational opportunities in Nigeria.

In November 2014, Olanrewaju founded Aid to Rural Education Initiative (AREAi) which aim to improve learning outcomes for poor and vulnerable children from low income families and in poor communities by empowering children in these communities, as a youth activist his online and offline advocacy efforts are centered around key themes of educational development such as education finance, safe youths and youth involvement in local and global education policy-making.

He has participated and represented Nigeria at high-level meetings such as the World Education Forum in Incheon, 66th UN/DPI NGO Conference in Gyeongju, 16th UNESCO Asia Conference on Quality Education in Bangkok, 14th United Nations Conference on Trade and Development in Nairobi, 7th UNESCO NGO Forum in Riyadh, Under-30 Young Change-makers Summit in New York, and spoke at the 1st World Youth Forum Sharm El Sheikh in Egypt and the 8th UNESCO NGO Forum in Paris.

Digilearns 
In July 2020 and as a response to mass school closures due to the Covid-19 pandemic, Gideon pioneered Digilearns, an emergency edtech learning intervention that delivers government-approved and contextually-relevant learning content in the form of textbook and revision materials quizzes and mini-lessons, via SMS and USSD, to basic-feature mobile phones that do not require internet connectivity. The solution attracted substantial funding to enable learning for disadvantaged children in remote communities across Nigeria, winning one of the forty three COVID-19 emergency grants provided by the Queen's Commonwealth Trust. It was awarded a One Young World Covid-19 Young Leaders Fund, supported by Bill and Melinda Gate Foundation and United Way. The low-cost technology solution is currently being used by refugees, indigent students and vulnerable children across numerous orphanages and communities across Nigeria.

Honours and invitations 

In September 2018, Gideon was appointed by Prime Minister Gordon Brown's Theirworld as one of the two youth representatives to the  73rd session of the United Nations General Assembly in New York. In October 2019, as a Deloitte sponsored delegate to the One Young World Summit in London, Gideon was invited to the Windsor Castle as part of a group of ten young leaders from across the world for a roundtable discussion with the Duke and Duchess of Sussex, Prince Harry and Megan Markle of the British Royal Family.

Awards and recognition

 2017, Recipient of the United Kingdom Chevening  Scholarship Award
 2018, Nominee, Future Award Africa Award Prize for Education
 2019, Nominee, SMS 100 25 under 25 Award, Education Category
 2019, Awardee, Crans Montana New Leaders of Tomorrow
 2019, Recipient of 100 most Influential Young Nigerians Award
 2019, Recipient of Zenith Bank Heroes of our Time Award
 2020, Awardee, Royal African Youth Leadership Awards

Selected articles 

 
 The food entrepreneur, with eye on healthy nutrition, 2019. 
 Leading the way: Utilizing a UK education to better the world, 2020. 
 The power of youth in ensuring quality education for all, 2018.

References

External links 
The Prince of Education – Gideon Olanrewaju
Advancing quality education in Nigeria: a consultation hosted by Aid for Rural Education Access Initiative

1993 births
Living people
People from Osun State
Nigerian businesspeople
Nigerian activists
Alumni of the University of Sussex
Ladoke Akintola University of Technology alumni
Chevening Scholars